Eiffel I'm in Love is a 2003 Indonesian teen romantic comedy film directed by Nasri Cheppy. The film stars Samuel Rizal and Shandy Aulia as the main characters, the film adaptation of the bestselling novel of the same name by Rachmania Arunita.  Other people appearing in the film include Titi Kamal, Helmy Yahya, Didi Petet, and Hilda Arifin.

The movie won an award for "Most Favorite Movie" and nomination for "Best Movie" at the 2004 MTV Indonesia Movie Awards.

Cast
Samuel Rizal as Adit
Yole Immanuel (uncredited role) as Young Adit (Extended version only)
Shandy Aulia as Tita
Vicka (uncredited role) as Young Tita (Extended version only)
Yogi Finanda as Ergi
Titi Kamal as Intan ( Cameo Guest Star)
Didi Petet as Reza (Father Adit)  
Hilda Arifin as Mother Tita
Helmy Yahya as Father Tita
Tommy Kurniawan as Alan
Saphira Indah as Uni
Rianti Cartwright as Fara

Plot
Based on the book with the same title, it tells the story about a teenage girl, Tita (Shandy Aulia), who led a perfect life. She had a lovely family, a patient boyfriend and 2 best friends who are always by her side. However, her mother was overly protective towards her and she is not allowed to go out. Her life completely changes when her parents good friend and his son, Adit (Samuel Rizal), came from France to stay with them. Tita was supposed to pick both of them from the airport. However, she waited at the wrong terminal and only realized that when Adit accidentally bumped into her and asked her whether she was the one who supposed to picked him and his father up. Adit was very cold to Tita from the start, however, her parents saw him as a reliable man and trust him to take care of their daughter. Things became worse when Adit told Tita that their parents were planning to forcibly match them as a couple.

Extended version
Eiffel I'm in Love has an extended version, which released a year later and reviews the story in this film in more depth.

Album

Eiffel I'm in Love is a soundtrack to the 2003 film of the same name, released in October 24, 2003, by Aquarius Musikindo. The soundtrack features Melly Goeslaw as the lead singer, Jimmo, and Yann (a former Koolkynky member). The soundtrack features ten original songs written for the film, as well as "Eiffel I'm in Love" film score composed by Goeslaw.

Track listing

Additional repackaged songs

Awards and nominations

References

External links
 

2003 films
2000s Indonesian-language films
2003 romantic comedy films
2000s teen romance films
2000s teen comedy films
Films shot in Indonesia
Films shot in France
Indonesian romantic comedy films
Indonesian teen romance films
Indonesian teen comedy films
Films scored by Melly Goeslaw
Films scored by Anto Hoed
Films directed by Nasri Cheppy